Nembi Plateau Rural LLG is a local-level government (LLG) of Southern Highlands Province, Papua New Guinea. The Nembi language is spoken in the LLG.

Wards
01. Uba No. 12
02. Uba No. 12
03. Embi 1
04. Embi 2
05. Pomberel 1
06. Pomberel 2
07. Tapua 13
08. Tapua 14
09. Karemela 1
10. Askam 2
11. Askam 1
12. Tegipo 1
13. Tegipo 2
14. Enjua 1
15. Enjua 2
16. Hulal 1
17. Hulal 2
18. Pinja 1
19. Pinja 2
20. Semin 1
21. Semin 2
22. Sepera 1
23. Sepera 2
24. Sepera 3
25. Sop Mul
26. Hupa 3

References

Local-level governments of Southern Highlands Province